Sosnovka is a rural locality (a village) in Berdyashsky Selsoviet, Zilairsky District, Bashkortostan, Russia. The population was 17 as of 2010. There is 1 street.

Geography 
Sosnovka is located 13 km west of Zilair (the district's administrative centre) by road. Berdyash is the nearest rural locality.

References 

Rural localities in Zilairsky District